The President's Cup (informally known as the Final Four of College Chess) determines the U.S. college team chess champion. Hosted in part by the United States Chess Federation (USCF), the President's Cup is an annual invitational team championship, open to the top four U.S. schools from the most recent Pan-American Intercollegiate Team Chess Championship (Pan-Am). It is run as a fixed-roster team round-robin tournament, scored by individual (not team) points. The President's Cup usually takes place in early Spring.

History
The President's Cup has taken place each year in various locations since it was founded in 2001 by Dr. Tim Redman with the financial support of University of Texas at Dallas president Dr. Franklyn Jenifer. Since 2011, the President's Cup has been sponsored in part by Booz Allen Hamilton. The event in 2020 was to be held in April but was cancelled due to the coronavirus pandemic. The Final Four teams that qualified that year were Texas Tech, University of Texas at Dallas, Webster University, and Saint Louis University.

Rules
The governing body for the President's Cup is the College Chess Committee (CCC) of the USCF. The event is rated by the USCF and World Chess Federation (FIDE) and played under USCF rules. The CCC has established eligibility requirements for college chess, and these same requirements apply to the Pan-Am and the President's Cup. Each team comprises four players and up to two alternates from the same school campus. Unlike the Pan-Am, ties for first place are broken (the title is not shared).

Significance
The winner of the President's Cup is considered the top chess team among U.S. post-secondary schools (colleges, universities, community colleges). By contrast, the Pan-Am determines the top post-secondary school in North American, Central America, South America, or the Caribbean. The winning school takes possession of the perpetual trophy, created in 2008 using funds from Sun Trust Bank, for one year.

Winners and venues

Bibliography
 Annual Reports of the USCF College Chess Committee
 Articles about the President's Cup published in Chess Life magazine
 
 Program booklets from the President's Cup for some years.

External links
 College Chess
 
 College Chess Eligibility Requirements at University of Texas at Dallas
 United States Chess Federation (USCF)
 World Chess Federation (FIDE)

Chess competitions
Chess in the United States
College sports championships in the United States
2001 in chess
Recurring sporting events established in 2001
2001 establishments in the United States